The 2003 Plaid Cymru leadership election was held following the resignation of Ieuan Wyn Jones after a disappointing showing in the 2003 Assembly elections where the party fell from 17 to 12 seats.

Ieuan Wyn Jones had led the party since 2000. Ieuan Wyn Jones initially resigned but then decided to contest the leadership election, he was challenged by Helen Mary Jones whom he had defeated three years previously, as well as Rhodri Glyn Thomas.

Voting closed in 15 September, with the results announced at Cardiff's St David's Hall on September 18.

The contest was narrowly won by Ieuan Wyn Jones in the final round with 2,603 votes, against Helen Mary Jones' 2,532.

Candidates and Endorsements

Ieuan Wyn Jones
Supporters included:
Dafydd Elis Thomas, former Plaid Cymru President and AM for Meirionnydd Nant Conwy
Elfyn Llwyd, MP for Meirionnydd Nant Conwy

Helen Mary Jones
Supporters included:
 Dafydd Wigley, former Plaid Cymru President 
 Hywel Williams, MP for Caernarfon
 Dafydd Iwan
 Cllr Lindsay Whittle, Caerphilly Council Leader

Rhodri Glyn Thomas
Supporters included:

Results

Turnout was around 61% of Plaid's estimated 8,500 members.

References

2003 elections in the United Kingdom
2003
2003 in Wales
2000s elections in Wales
Plaid Cymru leadership election